Trevor Richardson Glover (born 26 November 1951) is an English former cricketer and rugby union player.

Glover was born at Lancaster and was educated at the Lancaster Royal Grammar School. From there he went up to Lincoln College, Oxford. While studying at Oxford, he made his debut in first-class cricket for Oxford University against Surrey at Oxford in 1973. He played first-class cricket for Oxford until 1975, making 22 appearances. He scored 769 runs at an average of 18.75. He made two centuries, with a high score of 117 against Worcestershire in 1975, the same season he captained Oxford. In addition to playing first-class cricket, Glover also appeared in List A one-day cricket, making two appearances for Oxford University in the 1973 Benson & Hedges Cup, before making four further appearances for the Combined Universities cricket team in the 1975 Benson & Hedges Cup. He gained blues in both cricket and rugby union while at Oxford, where he appeared for Oxford University RFC, before later playing for Bedford Blues.

References

External links

1951 births
Living people
Alumni of Lincoln College, Oxford
Bedford Blues players
British Universities cricketers
Cricketers from Lancaster, Lancashire
English cricketers
English rugby union players
Oxford University cricketers
Oxford University RFC players
People educated at Lancaster Royal Grammar School
Rugby union players from Lancaster